The Museum of Tyrolean Farms is an open-air museum in Kramsach, Austria. As at 2009 the museum had around 30 historic farmsteads and other historic rural buildings as well as their associated barns, sheds, alms and storehouses.

History 

The prototype was open-air museums in Scandinavia, for example the Skansen in  Stockholm founded in 1891. Initially the number of farmhouses was 14; when the museum is full there will be 50 individual museum displays.

The museum and its purpose 
The museum farms are arranged along a valley that broadly represents the geographical situation of Tyrol. The farms are open and accessible and some of them are historically furnished and equipped. In each farm there is a detailed description of its construction, age and original location. As well as farms, the museum also has a school, a shooting range, a watermill, a smithy, a fire station and a public baths. The oldest farms are the Tierstaller from South Tyrol, a farmhouse with a Paarhof layout from before 1500 and the Alter Segger from East Tyrol with roots going back to the Middle Ages around 1400.

The museum carries out research, education and building conservation. Visiting schoolchildren are given a vivid insight into the agricultural history of the Tyrol.

Gallery

Examples of farms displayed 
 Hörl-Wetscher,  Walchsee,  Kufstein District (1577)
 Hackler, Alpbach, Kufstein District (1675)
 Gwiggen, Wildschönau, Kufstein District (1569)
 Schrofenaste, Zillertal, Schwaz District (1803)
 Franzl’s Klaisla’s, Ötztal, Imst District (1585)
 Zenzl, Pitztal, Imst District (1716)
 Burgas-Wechner, Lech valley, Reutte District (16. Jh.)
 Trujer-Gregörler, Fließ, Landeck District (1550/1646)
 Falkner-Schnaitter, Hatting, Innsbruck Land (17th-18th century)

Sources 
 Brochures issued by the Museum Tiroler Bauernhöfe.

External links 

 Museum Tiroler Bauernhöfe

Open-air museums in Austria
Museums in Tyrol (state)